The Cathedral Church of Our Lady of Good Aid, popularly known as Motherwell Cathedral, is a Roman Catholic cathedral located in Motherwell, North Lanarkshire, Scotland. It is the seat of the Bishop of Motherwell, and mother church of the Diocese of Motherwell.

History
The Church of Our Lady of Good Aid, Motherwell was opened on Monday 9 December 1900. In 1948, the church was elevated to the status of cathedral after the new Motherwell Diocese was erected as a suffragan see by the apostolic constitution Maxime interest. The Scottish Catholic Directory of 1901 includes in the list of events for the year 1899-1900 the "Opening of the Church of Our Lady of Good Aid, Motherwell" on Monday 9 December 1900, the feast of the Immaculate Conception transferred from Sunday. It includes a description of the church's dimensions and principal architectural features.

Music
Motherwell Cathedral's organ was renovated in 2008, and is noted for its size. It was electronically modified with a new console installed. With four manuals it is the largest organ of any Roman Catholic church in the West of Scotland. The cathedral organist is John Pitcathely, who played the organ at both of the Papal visits to Scotland. The Motherwell Diocesan Choir sings at many of the major services in the cathedral and also sings at the 5.30pm vigil Mass on Saturdays. The Motherwell Diocesan Choir, which is distinct from the Cathedral Choir, is directed by John Pitcathely.

Architecture
The cathedral was designed in the Gothic revival style by the celebrated architects Pugin and Pugin and resembles many Catholic churches designed by them in Scotland, England and Ireland. The church originally had a high altar and two side altars. However, these and much of the ornate decoration were lost in the re-ordering of the sanctuary in 1984 in accordance with the reforms of the Second Vatican Council.

Services
Saturday vigil
5.30pm

Sunday
10.30am, 6.30pm

Monday - Saturday
10.00am

Clergy
List of parish priests of the Parish Church of Our Lady of Good Aid 

 Rev. James Gilmour 1875-1877
 Rev. James Glancey D.D. 1877-1888
 Very Rev. John Canon Taylor 1888-1917
 Rt. Rev. Mgr. Thomas Canon Currie 1917-1935
 Rev. Bartholomew Atkinson 1935-1946
 Very Rev. Denis Canon Flynn 1947-1956

List of deans of the Cathedral Church of Our Lady of Good Aid (Motherwell Cathedral)

 Very Rev. Denis Canon Flynn 1947-1956
 Rt. Rev. Mgr. Gerard M. Rogers 1956-1960
 Rt. Rev. Mgr. John Conroy 1960-1981
 Very Rev. Noel Canon Carey 1981-2011
 Rt. Rev. Mgr. Thomas Canon Millar V.G. 2011–2017
 Rev. Gerard Chromy V.G. 2017-2022
 Rev. Brian Lamb 2022-present

The parish priest of the cathedral is also parish priest of St Luke's Motherwell as the parishes are now merged.

See also
List of cathedrals in the United Kingdom

External links

Religion in Motherwell
Buildings and structures in Motherwell
Roman Catholic cathedrals in Scotland
Roman Catholic churches completed in 1900
19th-century Roman Catholic church buildings in the United Kingdom
1900 establishments in Scotland